Svetlana Vladimirovna Zakharova, (born 15 September 1970 in Chuvashia) is a Russian long-distance runner, who specializes in marathon races. She won several international marathons, such as: the Honolulu Marathon (1997, 2002 and 2009), the Chicago Marathon (2003) and the Boston Marathon (2003). She participated twice in the Olympic Games.

At the Olympic Games in 2004 at Athens she finished 9th in the marathon in 2:32:04.  At the Olympic Games in 2008 at Beijing she finished 22nd in the marathon in 2:32:16.

In the 1990s sometimes she raced under the name Svetlana Vasilyeva.

Svetlana Zakharova has been married to her coach Nikolai Zacharov.

Achievements

Personal bests
Half marathon - 1:09:48 hrs (2002)
Marathon - 2:21:31 hrs (2002)

External links

marathoninfo

1970 births
Living people
Russian female long-distance runners
Russian female marathon runners
Athletes (track and field) at the 2004 Summer Olympics
Athletes (track and field) at the 2008 Summer Olympics
Olympic athletes of Russia
Boston Marathon female winners
Chicago Marathon female winners
World Athletics Championships medalists
People from Urmarsky District
Sportspeople from Chuvashia
21st-century Russian women
20th-century Russian women